West Virginia wine refers to wine made from grapes grown in the U.S. state of West Virginia.  West Virginia has 11 wineries located throughout the state, including three designated American Viticultural Areas.  Because of the state's cold winter climate, most producers focus on French hybrid grape varieties.  The most successful Vitis vinifera plantings are Riesling in the northeast portion of the state.

See also
American wine

References

 
Wine regions of the United States by state